Throb is an American sitcom that aired in syndication from September 6, 1986, to May 21, 1988. The series, created by Fredi Towbin, was produced by Procter & Gamble Productions in association with Taft Entertainment Television, and was distributed by Worldvision Enterprises. The series' rights are currently held by CBS Television Distribution.

Synopsis
The series revolved around thirty-something divorcee Sandy Beatty (Diana Canova), who gets a job at a small new wave record label, Throb. Beatty's boss is Zachary Armstrong (Jonathan Prince), who had a huge crush on Sandy. Beatty also has a 12-year-old son named Jeremy (played in the first season by Paul Walker and in season two by Sean de Veritch). Beatty's best friend was Meredith (Maryedith Burrell), a single teacher who lived in her building, and her co-workers included hip business manager Phil Gaines (Richard Cummings, Jr.), and British-born Prudence Anne Bartlett, who was nicknamed "Blue" (Jane Leeves).

During the second season, Sandy moved from her original apartment to the recently vacated penthouse in her building. She took in her co-worker Blue to help out with rent, but the differences between straitlaced, somewhat conservative Sandy and the free-spirited Blue became more pronounced as they both lived and worked together. However, they were still friends.

Casting
This show was the first time many American TV viewers saw Jane Leeves, who later gained fame as Daphne Moon on Frasier. Paul Walker  played Jeremy Beatty for the first season, and would become a leading man in Hollywood some 15 years later, particularly after his breakthrough role in The Fast and the Furious.

The creation of the Zachary Armstrong character, and the casting of Jonathan Prince in the role, was inspired by the (then) current rising fame of Michael J. Fox. Prince bore a strong physical resemblance to Fox, and played Zachary with many similar characterizations as Fox's Family Ties character, Alex P. Keaton. Like Alex Keaton, Zachary was also a young, diminutive overachiever on the fast track who found himself attracted to women who were both older and taller than he, the main object of his affection being Sandy.

Cast
Diana Canova - Sandy Beatty
Jonathan Prince - Zachary Armstrong
Maryedith Burrell - Meredith
Jane Leeves - "Blue" (Prudence Anne Bartlett)
Richard Cummings Jr. - Phil Gaines
Paul Walker - Jeremy Beatty (1986–87) (as Paul W. Walker)
Sean de Veritch - Jeremy Beatty (1987–88)

Episodes

Season 1: 1986–1987

Season 2: 1987–1988

References

External links
 
German fan site

1986 American television series debuts
1988 American television series endings
1980s American sitcoms
English-language television shows
First-run syndicated television programs in the United States
Television series by Procter & Gamble Productions
Television series by CBS Studios
Television shows set in New York City